Calgary-West (formerly styled Calgary West from 1957 to 1971) is a provincial electoral district for the Legislative Assembly of Alberta, Canada.

The electoral riding of Calgary West is one of the two original Calgary ridings of the seven that has survived from the 1959 Redistribution of the Calgary riding. The other riding is Calgary-Glenmore.

This riding covers the central west portion of Calgary and contains the neighbourhoods of Cougar Ridge, Coach Hill, Strathcona, Signal Hill, Discovery Ridge, Springbank Hill, Strathcona, Aspen Woods, West Springs, Springhaven, Montreaux, Spring Hill, Richmond Hill, Wentworth, Patterson, Glamorgan, Glenbrook and Christie Park.

History
The electoral district was first created in 1957 and used in 1959 as part of the original boundary redistribution for Calgary after the Social Credit government decided to return to the first past the post method of voting.

The 2010 boundary redistribution saw significant changes to the riding. It lost all land east of Sarcee Trail to Calgary-Currie and all land north of Bow Trail to Calgary-Bow.

Boundary history

Representation history

The electoral district was first contested in the 1959 general election, and returned Social Credit candidate Donald Fleming. He won just over half of the popular vote in the new seat to pick it up for his party. Fleming faced a stiff challenge running in his second term in the 1963 election from Progressive Conservative leader Milt Harradence.  Although Fleming won, he tallied under half the popular vote and only held off Harradence by just over a thousand votes.

The 1967 election would see Calgary West swing to the Progressive Conservatives. Fleming was defeated by Harradence's successor as PC leader, Peter Lougheed, who won the seat with a near landslide majority. He would go on to become Leader of the Opposition after he and five other candidates were elected.

Lougheed ran for his second term in the 1971 general election and won easily. His party would go on to form government in the province for the first time ever, and Lougheed became Premier. Lougheed would easily hold the district for the next three terms winning landslide majorities. He won his highest popular vote in the riding for the 1982 election as well as the highest number of seats in Alberta's history. Lougheed retired as Premier in 1985 and vacated Calgary-West on February 28, 1986.

The electoral district remained vacant for about two months until the 1986 general election which occurred in May of that year. The third representative for the riding was Progressive Conservative candidate Elaine McCoy who held the district losing almost half of the popular vote that Lougheed had won in 1982. She was appointed to the cabinet under Lougheed's successor, Don Getty.

McCoy won re-election in the 1989 election with a reduced majority. In 1992 she ran for leadership of the Progressive Conservative Association after Getty retired. She failed in her bid for leader losing to Ralph Klein. She did not run for a third term in 1993 and retired from the Legislature.

The 1993 election would see Calgary-West won by Liberal candidate Danny Dalla-Longa who won with a strong door knocking campaign over Progressive Conservative candidate Ron Leigh who had served as an Alderman on Calgary City Council. Dalla-Longa would only serve a single term in office retiring in 1997.

After Dalla-Longa retired the riding returned to the Progressive Conservative party selecting candidate Karen Kryczka in the 1997 election. She would be re-elected in 2001 winning a higher raw popular vote than Lougheed won in 1982. Kryczka retired at dissolution in 2004.

The most recent member of the legislature was Ron Liepert who won his first term in the 2004 election. He would be appointed to the cabinet in 2006 under the government of Ed Stelmach. He won his second term in office in 2008 with a larger majority.

Legislature results

1959 general election

1963 general election

1967 general election

1971 general election

1975 general election

1979 general election

1982 general election

1986 general election

1989 general election

1993 general election

1997 general election

2001 general election

2004 general election

2008 general election

2012 general election

2014 by-election

2015 general election

2019 general election

Senate nominee results

2004 Senate nominee election district results

Voters had the option of selecting 4 Candidates on the Ballot

2012 Senate nominee election district results

Student Vote results

2004 election

On November 19, 2004 a Student Vote was conducted at participating Alberta schools to parallel the 2004 Alberta general election results. The vote was designed to educate students and simulate the electoral process for persons who have not yet reached the legal majority. The vote was conducted in 80 of the 83 provincial electoral districts with students voting for actual election candidates. Schools with a large student body that reside in another electoral district had the option to vote for candidates outside of the electoral district then where they were physically located.

2012 election

References

External links
Demographics for Calgary West
Riding Map for Calgary West
The Legislative Assembly of Alberta

Alberta provincial electoral districts
Politics of Calgary